The 2010–11 Loyola Ramblers men's basketball team represented Loyola University Chicago in the 2010–11 NCAA Division I men's basketball season. Their head coach was Jim Whitesell. The Ramblers play edtheir home games at the Joseph J. Gentile Center and were members of the Horizon League. They finished the season 16–15, 7–11 in Horizon League play and lost in the first round of the 2011 Horizon League men's basketball tournament to Detroit.

Roster

Schedule

|-
!colspan=9 style=| Exhibition

|-
!colspan=9 style=| Regular season

|-
!colspan=9 style=| Horizon League tournament

References

Loyola Ramblers
Loyola Ramblers men's basketball seasons
Loyola Ramblers
Loyola Ramblers